Lerida is a locality in the Upper Lachlan Shire, New South Wales, Australia. It lies on the road from Gunning to Collector, about 11 km southeast of Gunning and 69 km north of Canberra.

References

Upper Lachlan Shire
Localities in New South Wales
Southern Tablelands